Celebration or Celebrations may refer to:

Film, television and theatre 
Celebration (musical), by Harvey Schmidt and Tom Jones, 1969
 Celebration (play), by Harold Pinter, 2000
 Celebration (TV series), a Canadian music TV series
 Celebration at Big Sur, or Celebration, a 1969 concert film
 The Celebration, or Festen, a 1998 Danish film

Music
Celebration (2000s band), a Baltimore-based band
Celebration (2006 album), 2006
Celebration (1970s band), an American band fronted by Mike Love
Celebration (1979 album)

Albums
Celebration (Bheki Mseleku album), 1991
Celebration (Deuter album), 1976
Celebration (DJ BoBo album), 2002
Celebration (Eric Kloss album), 1979
Celebration (Janie Frickie album), 1987
Celebration (Julian Lloyd Webber album), 2001
Celebration (Madonna album), or the song title, 2009
Celebration: The Video Collection
Celebration (Simple Minds album), 1982
Celebration (Smokie album), 1994
Celebration (United DJ's vs. Pandora album), 2007
Celebration, by Ilegales, 2011
Celebration, by Olsen Brothers, 2005
Celebration, by Osibisa, 1980 
Celebration, by Roger Whittaker, 1993
Celebration!, by The Wiggles, 2012
Celebration – Forty Years of Rock, by Uriah Heep, 2009
Celebration – The Anniversary Album, by Johnny Mathis, 1981
Celebrations, by Bob Degen, 1968
Celebration (Andrew Cyrille album), 1975

Songs
"Celebration" (AnnaGrace song), 2010
"Celebration" (Kool & the Gang song), 1980, also covered by Kylie Minogue
"Celebration" (Madonna song), 2009
"Celebration" (The Game song), 2012
"Celebration", by Dareysteel, 2014
"Celebration" (Fun Factory song), 1995
"Celebration", by Hafdis Huld, from Dirty Paper Cup, 2006
"Celebration", by Kanye West, from Late Registration, 2005
"Celebration", by Kendrick Lamar, from Kendrick Lamar, 2009
"Celebration", by Krokus, from Hardware, 1981
"Celebration", by Kendrick Lamar from Kendrick Lamar, 2009
"Celebration", by Lil Gotit, from Hood Baby, 2018
"Celebration", by Paul McCartney, from Standing Stone, 1997
"Celebration", by They Might Be Giants, from Join Us, 2011
"Celebration", by Tommy James, 1972
"Celebration", by Tyga, from Careless World: Rise of the Last King, 2012 
"Celebrations", by Brothers Johnson, from Light Up the Night, 1980
"A Celebration", by U2, 1982
"A Celebration", by Joe Satriani from Unstoppable Momentum, 2013
"Celebration", by Wet Wet Wet, from High on the Happy Side, 1992

Other uses
 Celebration, Florida, a place in the United States
 Celebration (Alaska festival), a biennial Tlingit, Haida and Tsimshian cultural event
 Celebration (ship), a cruise ship, now MS Grand Celebration
 Celebration (Tyeb Mehta), a  triptych painting
 'Celebration', a variety of barley
 Celebration series of art works by Jeff Koons
 Celebration, a type of public performance event created by the American choreographer Marilyn Wood
 Celebrations (confectionery), a miniature chocolate bar collection by Mars
 Celebrations Group, a chain of British greeting cards stores
 McDowell's No.1 Celebration, or Celebration Rum, a rum by United Spirits Limited of India

See also

 

Celebrate (disambiguation)